The Yuba-Sutter Gold Sox were a summer collegiate wood-bat baseball club based in Marysville, California, in the United States, that began as an independent professional team in 1995.  They played their home games at Bryant Field, adjacent to Ellis Lake, in Marysville from 2002 to 2022.  The team name was changed to the Marysville Gold Sox in 2010 to more particularly identify the city in which the team was located, but had since reverted to "Yuba-Sutter".

The Gold Sox name was chosen in honor of Yuba-Sutter (two adjoining counties separated by a river with the towns of Marysville and Yuba City on each side), having been called the "Gateway to the Gold Fields" during the California gold rush of the mid-1800s. The Gold Sox mascot is Mr. G, a gecko-like creature that is a favorite with children.

The Gold Sox ceased operations and will be replaced by the Marysville Drakes of the Pecos League.

Team history

Professional Team

Western Baseball League (2002)
The franchise began as a professional team in the Western Baseball League in 1995 as the Surrey Glaciers and only played one season at Stetson Bowl in Surrey, British Columbia, Canada. In 1996 they relocated to Reno, Nevada, becoming known as the Reno Chukars and played their home games at Moana Stadium. They changed their name to the Reno Blackjacks in 1999 and played their final season in Reno before relocating to Marysville, where they were renamed the Feather River Mudcats for their inaugural 2000 season in Marysville.

Because of the team's infringement on the previously trademarked name of Mudcats by the Carolina Mudcats of the Southern League, the Feather River Mudcats changed their name to the Feather River Fury in preparation for the 2001 season, though never took the field under that name since the team filed for bankruptcy prior to the season start. There was no baseball in Marysville for the 2001 season.

The City of Marysville stepped in to operate the team for the 2002 season in order to keep baseball alive in the area and the city-owned ballpark in use. The City changed the name to Yuba-Sutter Gold Sox and played the season in the Western Baseball League. Upon conclusion of that 2002 season the Western Baseball League disbanded, thus ending the Gold Sox as a professional team.

Collegiate Summer Baseball
The team was purchased from the City in 2003 by Bob Bavasi of Bavasi Sports Partners and local auto dealer Don McCullough (1936–2005) and began 2003 season play as a summer collegiate wood-bat team as it remains to this day.

The ball club played the 2003 and 2004 seasons in the California Collegiate League.

In 2005, the Gold Sox became the host team for the Horizon Air Summer Series, a collegiate wood bat league created by Bob Bavasi.

Prior to the 2005 season, Don McCullough died. Upon McCullough's death, Peter Bavasi, former General Manager of the San Diego Padres, President of the Toronto Blue Jays and Cleveland Indians, came out of retirement to help administer the club for the 2005 and 2006 seasons.

On January 1, 2007, Bob Bavasi invited Fair Oaks attorney Tom Lininger and his wife Karyn to join in the ownership of the club as majority shareholders. The team was renamed the Marysville Gold Sox in 2010.  Tom Lininger became the team's managing partner and sold the team after the 2014 season.

Great West League (2016-2018)

In 2015, the organization was sold to CSH Holdings, Pat Gillick, Kevin Knight and Jake Knight. In 2016, the team moved to the Great West League which played a balanced schedule home and away.  The League and team conduct operations like a class A short season minor league baseball team (examples: New York-Penn League and Northwest League).  The ownership group hired veteran general manager Michael Mink to handle the operation in November 2016.

On November 6, 2017, the Gold Sox management announced that they were reverting the team name back to the Yuba-Sutter Gold Sox after the originally-named professional team.

On October 4, 2018, the Gold Sox announced that they are considering options for 2019 and beyond as a result of the Great West League suspending operations.  On November 15, 2018, the Gold Sox announced that they would cease operations if new ownership was not found.

Golden State Collegiate Baseball League (2019)
In 2019, a new local group, YCM Baseball Group, LLC, lead by local agricultural entrepreneur Al Montna, purchased the Gold Sox and became members of the Golden State Collegiate Baseball League joining former GWL rivals the Medford Rogues.

Montna Farms Summer Series (2020-2022)
In 2020, the Gold Sox season in the GSCBL was cancelled due to the COVID-19 pandemic.  As a result, they helped create a smaller short-season league known as the Sierra Central-Montna Farms Summer Series.  The Gold Sox were the inaugural champions defeating the Lincoln Potters.  The Series launched its second season in 2021, which they named themselves champions.  In 2022, the series name was shortened to the Montna Farms Summer Series.  Also in 2022, the Gold Sox joined the Bay Area Collegiate League.

On hiatus
On September 7, 2022, the Gold Sox announced that they will not be taking to the field in 2023 and will reevaluate their position in summer collegiate baseball in the region.  They are officially considering themselves "on hiatus", though they have effectively ceased operations.  They will be replaced by the new Marysville Drakes of the Pecos League.

Bryant Field

Since their inception, the Gold Sox have played their home games at what was originally known as Bryant Field, located along Highway 70 in the east part of Marysville.  It has experienced several name changes since then, including Appeal-Democrat Park, All Seasons RV Stadium, Colusa Casino Stadium and Hard Rock Park.  The stadium is once again known as Bryant Field.  The Gold Sox shared their field with the Yuba City Bears, who joined the GWL in 2017, then later folded their GWL operations.

Year-by-year record

Notable alumni
Dallas Braden (2003)
Tommy Everidge (2003, 2004)
Anthony Bass (2007)
Curtis Partch (2007)
Brock Stassi (2007,2008, 2011)
Max Stassi (2009)
Cody Anderson (2010, 2011)
Justin Haley (2010)
Drew Anderson (2012)

Coaching staff
Brock Ragatz (field manager)
Ryan Mattheus (assistant coach)

Radio broadcasts
The Yuba-Sutter Gold Sox official flagship radio station was KUBA-AM 1600.  Todd Kuhnen provides play-by-play.  Games are currently broadcast on the team's Facebook Live page.

References

External links
 Official website

Amateur baseball teams in California
Marysville, California
Sports in Yuba County, California
Western Baseball League teams
Great West League
Professional baseball teams in California
Defunct independent baseball league teams
Companies based in Yuba County, California
College baseball leagues in the United States
2003 establishments in California